A total solar eclipse occurred on September 8, 1885. A solar eclipse occurs when the Moon passes between Earth and the Sun, thereby totally or partly obscuring the image of the Sun for a viewer on Earth. A total solar eclipse occurs when the Moon's apparent diameter is larger than the Sun's, blocking all direct sunlight, turning day into darkness. Totality occurs in a narrow path across Earth's surface, with the partial solar eclipse visible over a surrounding region thousands of kilometres wide.
The path of totality crossed New Zealand.

Observations

References

 NASA graphic
 Googlemap
 NASA Besselian elements
 
 Note on the track of the total phase in the solar eclipse of, September 8, 1885, in its passage across New Zealand, Hind, J. R.  Monthly Notices of the Royal Astronomical Society, Vol. 45, p. 126
 Art. LIX.—The Total Eclipse of the Sun of the 9th September, 1885 Transactions and Proceedings of the Royal Society of New Zealand
 Transactions and Proceedings of the Royal Society of New Zealand Second Meeting. 13th July, 1885.

1885 09 08
1885 in science
1885 09 08
September 1885 events